The Center Valley Well House is a historic water well building on the grounds of the Center Valley Elementary School on Arkansas Highway 124 in Center Valley, Arkansas.  It is an open-walled square stone structure, consisting of low stone walls and corner posts, which support a shallow-pitch pyramidal roof. The roof has exposed rafter ends in the Craftsman style, and the walls are capped by concrete coping.  Two of the walls have openings, which provide access (other than climbing on and over them) to the interior of the structure, which has a concrete floor.  It was built in 1940 to shelter the well providing water to the original 1939 school building, using materials left over from its construction.  It is a distinctive, yet modest, example of WPA architecture in the community.

The structure was listed on the National Register of Historic Places in 1992.

See also
Col. John Critz Farm Springhouse: NRHP-listed in White County, Arkansas
National Register of Historic Places listings in Pope County, Arkansas

References

National Register of Historic Places in Pope County, Arkansas
1940 establishments in Arkansas
American Craftsman architecture in Arkansas
Works Progress Administration in Arkansas
Water wells in the United States
Water supply infrastructure on the National Register of Historic Places
School buildings on the National Register of Historic Places in Arkansas
Education in Pope County, Arkansas
Water supply infrastructure in Arkansas